Mohamed Abdel Salam Mohamed Abdel Hamid (born 1 October 1997) is an Egyptian footballer who plays for Egyptian Premier League side Zamalek SC.

He competed at the 2020 Summer Olympics.

Honours

Club
Zamalek SC
Egyptian Premier League 2020-21
 Saudi-Egyptian Super Cup: 2018
 CAF Confederation Cup: 2018–19
Egypt Cup: 2018–19
Egyptian Super Cup: 2019–20
 CAF Super Cup: 2020

Egypt
Africa U-23 Cup of Nations Champions: 2019

References

External links 
 

1997 births
Living people
Egyptian footballers
Zamalek SC players
Footballers from Cairo
2019 Africa U-23 Cup of Nations players
Egyptian Premier League players
Association football central defenders
Footballers at the 2020 Summer Olympics
Olympic footballers of Egypt